The Ambassador Extraordinary and Plenipotentiary of the Russian Federation to the Italian Republic is the official representative of the President and the Government of the Russian Federation to the President and the Government of Italy.

The ambassador and his staff work at large in the Embassy of Russia at Via Gaeta, 5- 00185, Rome. There are consulates general in Milan, Palermo, and Genoa, and honorary consulates in Florence, Udine, Ancona, Venice, Verona, Naples, Messina, Pisa and Bari. The Russian ambassador to Italy is concurrently accredited as the Ambassador of Russia to San Marino.

History of diplomatic relations

The first relations between Russia and the predecessor states of modern Italy were established in the late 16th century. In 1862, Russia recognized the Kingdom of Italy and started to send its representatives. In 1876, the missions of the two countries in Saint Petersburg and Rome were transformed into embassies. After the February Revolution, Italy recognized the Russian Provisional Government, and later the Russian Soviet Federative Socialist Republic, de facto from 1921, and de jure from 1924. Diplomatic relations were interrupted on 22 June 1941 by the Axis invasion of the Soviet Union.

List of representatives (1862 - present)

Representatives of the Russian Empire to the Kingdom of Italy (1862 – 1917)

Representatives of the Russian Provisional Government to the Kingdom of Italy (1917)

Representatives of the Russian Soviet Federative Socialist Republic to the Kingdom of Italy (1921 - 1923)

Representatives of the Union of Soviet Socialist Republics to the Kingdom of Italy (1923 - 1946)

Representatives of the Union of Soviet Socialist Republics to the Republic of Italy (1946 - 1991)

Representatives of the Russian Federation to the Republic of Italy (1991 - present)

See also 
 Embassy of Italy in Moscow
 Foreign relations of Italy
 Foreign relations of Russia
 List of diplomatic missions of Russia

References

External links 
 Representatives of the Russian Empire
 List of ambassadors of the Soviet Union in Italy (1924 - 1941)
 List of Soviet ambassadors in Italy (1944 - 1991)
 Embassy of Russia in Rome, Italy

Italy
Russia